Katherine ("Kat") Merchant (born 29 October 1985) is an English female rugby union player who represented her country 58 times and scored 44 tries.

Life
Merchant was playing serious rugby when she was sixteen. She graduated from Birmingham University in Sport and Exercise Science in 2007.

She was playing for Worcester when she began her nine-year international career during the 2005 Six Nations. She played the 7 player and 15 player game and took part in two World Cups in both variations. She represented  at the 2010 Women's Rugby World Cup and was named in the squad for the 2014 Women's Rugby World Cup. She was a member of the squad to the 2013 Rugby World Cup Sevens

She announced her retirement in September 2014 with immediate effect on medical grounds, as she had taken a number of concussions.

In 2015 she was the coach for the Sri Lanka national team.  she was a personal trainer, and coach of Old Streetonians Rugby Club in central London.

References

External links
 Player Profile

1985 births
Living people
English female rugby union players
Female rugby sevens players
Alumni of the University of Birmingham
Rugby union players from Brighton
England international women's rugby sevens players